Maullín River() is a river of Chile located in the Los Lagos Region. The river originates as the outflow of Llanquihue Lake, and flows generally southwestward, over a number of small waterfalls, emptying into the Gulf of Coronados. The lower course of the river is a tidal estuary.

History
Franciscan Friar Francisco Alvarez Villanueva mention in 1780 Maullín River as the limit between the Spanish possessions and the "Cunco nation" to the north.

The river was first explored extensively in 1856 and 1857 by the Chilean Navy officers Francisco Hudson and Francisco Vidal Gormaz. The area around Llanquihue Lake was settled in the second half of the 19th century by German immigrants, who received land from the government in a scheme to encourage settlement in this area.

References

Rivers of Los Lagos Region
Rivers of Chile